Lúcia Maria Werner Viana (born March 9, 1953), better known as Lucinha Lins, is a Brazilian actress and singer-songwriter.

Career
Lucinha became first known by the public in the 1979 Rede Globo series Plantão de Polícia, pioneer in issues such as homosexuality and drug traffic on the Brazilian television. Two years later, she became recognized as a singer, after she won the Shell Music Festival performing Jerônimo Jardim's "Purpurina".

In 1980, she duetted with Rio superstar Jorge Ben on the track 'Georgia e Jorge' on his Alô, alô, Como Vai? album.

In 1984, Lucinha starred on the Globo miniseries Rabo-de-Saia. To promote her role, she posed nude for the August issue of Playboy. On the following year, she starred in Dias Gomes' Roque Santeiro, the highest rated telenovela in the history of Brazil, as the virgin widow of the title character, portrayed by José Wilker. In 1989, she starred in O Salvador da Pátria, which was accused by some of having an anti-Lula bias.

From 1991 to 1994, she had minor roles on Globo productions. She then decided to leave Globo to act in two SBT telenovelas, As Pupilas do Senhor Reitor and Sangue do Meu Sangue. In 1996, she acted on Rede Record's Perdidos de Amor. In 1997 she returned to Globo, to star on the third season of teen series Malhação. In 1999 she would return to Record to act on Tiro e Queda. In 2001 she returned to Globo, where she starred in Estrela Guia, alongside pop singer Sandy. She would also act on the network's Chocolate com Pimenta in 2003.

In 2004, she left Globo to star as Blanca on the SBT adaptation of Televisa's Esmeralda. Two years later, she signed with Record. Her first role on the network was on the controversial Vidas Opostas, which was the first telenovela in Brazil shot at a favela. Two years later, she would star as Vilma, the pyromaniac villain of Chamas da Vida, the network's current 10 p.m. telenovela. The first antagonist of her career has been acclaimed by both critics and public.

Personal life
Lucinha was married to MPB singer-songwriter Ivan Lins from 1971 to 1982. They had two children together, one of whom, Cláudio, is also an actor and singer. Lins let Lucinha keep his last name, for which she initially became recognized, after they got divorced. Since the early 1980s, Lucinha maintains a domestic partnership with fellow actor Cláudio Tovar, father of her only daughter Beatriz. On September 30, 2008, she became a grandmother.

TV roles

Telenovelas
 2017: Apocalipse as Lía
 2017: O Rico e Lázaro as Zelfa 
 2014: Vitória as Zulmira Nogueira (Zuzu)
 2011:	Vidas em Jogo as Alzira Duarte Monteiro (Zizi)
 2008: Chamas da Vida as Vilma Oliveira Santos
 2006: Vidas Opostas as Ísis Campobello
 2004: Esmeralda as Branca
 2003: Chocolate com Pimenta as Elvira Rodrigues Albuquerque
 2001: Estrela-Guia as Lucrécia Espíndola
 1999: Tiro e Queda as Isabel
 1998: Corpo Dourado as Hilda
 1997: Malhação as Bárbara
 1996: Perdidos de Amor as Lali
 1995: Sangue do Meu Sangue as Helena Rezende
 1994: As Pupilas do Senhor Reitor as Magali do Porto
 1994: A Viagem as Estela
 1993: Fera Ferida as Laurinda Mota da Costa
 1992: Despedida de Solteiro as Marta
 1991: O Dono do Mundo as Vanda
 1989: O Salvador da Pátria as Ângela
 1985: Roque Santeiro as Mocinha

Ministries
 1984: Rabo-de-Saia as Santinha

Series
 1991: Mundo da Lua as Roberta
 1981: Sítio do Picapau Amarelo as Rapunzel
 1979: Plantão de Polícia as Gisela

References

External links

1953 births
Living people
20th-century Brazilian women singers
20th-century Brazilian singers
Brazilian telenovela actresses